Shake Hands Forever is a novel by British writer Ruth Rendell, first published in 1975. It is the 9th entry in her popular Inspector Wexford series.

1975 British novels
Novels by Ruth Rendell
Hutchinson (publisher) books
Inspector Wexford series